...A Peaceful Riot... is the debut EP by underground hip hop duo Fatgums & Bambu, released on April 25, 2009.  Prior to the release, the duo's rapper Bambu had released three solo albums entitled Self Untitled..., ...I Scream Bars for the Children..., and ...Exact Change..., and one album entitled Barrel Men as a member of the group Native Guns.

Track listing

References

External links
 Bambu's website 
 Beatrock Music

2009 debut albums
Bambu (rapper) albums
Beatrock Music albums
Fatgums albums
Albums produced by Fatgums